The Sazuke (おさづけ Osazuke) refers to a prayer in which a Tenrikyo follower asks for divine intervention to heal an ailment.

Etymology 
In the original Japanese, the term is preceded by an honorific prefix and is written in hiragana: おさづけ. The kanji most commonly associated with the term is 授, meaning "give, grant; impart, teach" and "be granted/taught." The follower who administers the Sazuke to the suffering person acts as a mediator through which Tenri-O-no-Mikoto grants the blessing of a cure.

Bestowal 
In her lifetime, Nakayama Miki bestowed the Sazuke to her most devout followers. After she passed in 1887, Izo Iburi bestowed the Sazuke in her place. Initially, followers who distinguished themselves during Nakayama's physical lifetime would receive the Sazuke spontaneously as a divine direction. Increased demand for the Sazuke led to the creation of a standard lecture system known as the Besseki in 1889 or 1890. This system continues to this day. Nowadays, members who wish to receive the Sazuke are asked to attend nine lectures that cover Nakayama's life and teachings.

Sazuke of Hand Dance
Nakayama and Iburi bestowed several forms of the Sazuke during their lifetimes, but today only one form is practiced – the "Sazuke of Hand Dance," or the "Sazuke of Ashiki Harai." The person administering this grant chants "Ashiki harai tasuke tamae, Tenri-Ō-no-Mikoto" three times with accompanying hand movements and then chants "Namu tasuke tamae Tenri-Ō-no-Mikoto" three times while stroking the afflicted area. This process is repeated two more times.

Outdated forms

Earliest forms 
During Nakayama Miki's lifetime, the Sazuke was a generic term that referred to any grant that she bestowed on her followers. The first set of these grants included the Sazuke of the Fan, the Sazuke of the Gohei, and the Sazuke of Fertilizer, bestowed from 1864 to 1867.

Sazuke of the Fan 
Nakayama began to bestow the Sazuke of the Fan in the spring of 1864, to about 50 to 60 people. With this Sazuke, followers had the ability to inquire the divine will and receive a response by reading the movements of a fan received from Nakayama. The follower would place the fan on his lap, ponder over the illness of a person, and then interpret whether or not there whether or not the person would recover based on which direction the fan moved.

Nakayama banned the Sazuke of the Fan around 1868, and one conjecture for the reason this Sazuke was banned was that "God's will was not conveyed as it should have been; some egotistic, personal interpretations were mixed" in inquiries.

The Sazuke of the Fan is mentioned in Song Six and Song Twelve of the Mikagura-uta.

Sazuke of the Gohei 
The Sazuke of the Gohei is similar to the Sazuke of the Fan, except that a gohei was used in place of a fan.

Sazuke of Fertilizer 
The recipient of this Sazuke would make an offering of three gō 合 (about a third of a pint) each of rice-bran, ashes, and soil. When this mixture was placed in a field, Nakayama said that the mixture would be just as effective as one da 駄 (about 300 pounds) of night soil.

The Sazuke of Fertilizer is mentioned in the Ofudesaki, Song One of the Mikagura-uta, as well as Anecdotes of Oyasama (story #12).

For the healing of illness 
In December 1874, Nakayama Miki began to bestow grants that allowed followers to petition the divine to heal physical ailments. According to Nakayama's hagiography, she bestowed different forms of the Sazuke to followers on December 26:

"First, I bestow the Grant of Breath to Nakata. Second, the Grant of Boiled Rice to Matsuo. Third, the Grant of Hand Dance to Tsuji, which is to be performed with an innocent heart like that of a three-year-old child. Fourth, the Grant of the Kanrodai-Teodori to Masui, which is to be performed in one accord, all firmly united."

Sazuke of Breath 
The person administering this grant would breathe on the afflicted area of an ill person. or breathe on sheets of rice paper called o-iki no kami (literally, "paper of the sacred breath").

This grant is mentioned in the Ofudesaki, usually with the Sazuke of Hand Dance.

Sazuke of Boiled Rice 
The person administering this grant would place three gō of clean rice in a bag, immerse it three times in boiling water, and have the afflicted person eat three grains from it.

Sazuke for the Family 
Another name for this grant was the Sazuke of Stroking Hands.

Sazuke of the Kanrodai-Teodori 
This grant was similar to the Sazuke of the Hand Dance, except that sections two and three of the Mikagura-uta were performed instead of section one. Out of all the grants by Nakayama Miki and Izo Iburi, this one was the least commonly bestowed.

Sazuke of Water 
The person administering this grant would sip water three times from a cup and then have its recipient drink the rest.

Sazuke of Sacred Water with the Food of Heaven 
This grant was similar to the Sazuke of Water except white sugar was added to the water.

References

Tenrikyo